Jamilu Collins (born 5 August 1994) is a Nigerian professional footballer who plays as a left-back for Welsh club Cardiff City and the Nigeria national team.

Club career

Rijeka and loans
Born in Kaduna, Collins spent his youth years with Abuja Football College Academy. He was one of several players who moved from Abuja to the HNK Rijeka youth team in mid-2012. In October 2012, Collins signed his first professional contract with HNK Rijeka.

In August 2013, he was loaned to NK Pomorac in Druga HNL, where he collected 29 caps. In the following season, he played for HNK Rijeka's reserve side in Croatia's Treća HNL, where he was capped on 24 occasions. In May 2015, he signed a new one-year contract with the club, with an option to extend it for an additional year.

In June 2015, Rijeka sent Collins on loan to NK Krka in the Slovenian PrvaLiga, where he made 13 appearances before returning to Rijeka in January 2016. The following month, Collins was loaned to HNK Šibenik in Druga HNL, where he was a regular starter. Following return from the loan, Rijeka extended Collins' contract until June 2017. He was immediately loaned to fellow Prva HNL club NK Istra 1961.

SC Paderborn
On 6 September 2017, free agent Collins joined 3. Liga side SC Paderborn 07 on a two-year contract following trials at the club. He scored his first goal for the club two years later with a 35-yard shot against Bayern Munich in a 3-2 defeat.

Cardiff City
On 20 May 2022, Collins signed for EFL Championship team Cardiff City. Collins said “I’m really excited to be in Cardiff, and I can’t wait to get started. The Club has great history, and when I got the call to come to Cardiff, I was so excited, I couldn’t resist. I’m looking forward to the challenge of the new season. The goal is to fight for the Premier League. I can’t wait to meet the supporters and to fight for the jersey."

International career
Collins received his first call-up to the Nigeria national team for an Africa Cup of Nations qualification match against Seychelles on 11 September 2018. He made his debut a day later in a friendly against Liberia. After talking up his qualities, coach Gernot Rohr handed the 24-year-old his competitive debut in the next Afcon qualifying fixture against Libya in Uyo. Nigeria defeated their visitors 4–0 and the left-back was impressive, coming close to marking his Super Eagles debut with a goal. He featured in the reverse fixture in Sfax, Tunisia, which ended in a 3–2 victory for Nigeria to top Group E.

On 25 December 2021, He was shortlisted in 2021 AFCON Nations Cup by Caretaker Coach Eguavoen as part of the 28-Man Nigeria Squad

Career statistics

Club

International

References

External links

1994 births
Living people
Sportspeople from Kaduna
Nigerian footballers
Nigeria international footballers
Nigerian expatriate footballers
Association football fullbacks
HNK Rijeka players
HNK Rijeka II players
NK Pomorac 1921 players
NK Krka players
HNK Šibenik players
NK Istra 1961 players
SC Paderborn 07 players
Cardiff City F.C. players
Slovenian PrvaLiga players
First Football League (Croatia) players
Croatian Football League players
3. Liga players
2. Bundesliga players
Bundesliga players
Expatriate footballers in Croatia
Expatriate footballers in Slovenia
Expatriate footballers in Germany
Expatriate footballers in Wales
Nigerian expatriate sportspeople in Slovenia
Nigerian expatriate sportspeople in Croatia
Nigerian expatriate sportspeople in Germany
Nigerian expatriate sportspeople in Wales
2019 Africa Cup of Nations players
2021 Africa Cup of Nations players
English Football League players